Simon Coates (born in Sheffield) is a British mixed media artist, writer & curator.

About 
Coates attended Plymouth College of Art, where he completed a course in Foundation Art. He went on to complete a degree in Fashion Design at Harrow College of Art, which became part of the University of Westminster in 1990.

In Dubai in September 2015 he launched the Middle East's only sound art club night – Tse Tse Fly Middle East – with Ram Nath. Tse Tse Fly Middle East now features an artist collective, and produces and curates exhibitions and live events. Coates manages all Tse Tse Fly Middle East's artistic directions. Since January 2015 he has produced a monthly two-hour radio programme for UK station Resonance EXTRA. The programme features sound art, noise and experimental music from the Middle East, Africa and the Indian subcontinent.  He also produced a five part radio series named Tse Tse Fly Further East that featured the sound art scenes in the following South East Asian countries: Philippines (episode 1), Thailand (episode 2), Malaysia and Indonesia (episode 3), Vietnam and Loas (episode 4) and South Korea (episode 5).

Between October 2013 and May 2015 Coates was General Manager of the Dubai Community Theatre and Arts Centre (DUCTAC). During his time there Coates introduced an art commissioning programme, curated the UAE’s first-ever exhibition of sound art (Peace In An Open Space) and project-managed an exhibition of work by Turner Prize winner Jeremy Deller.  He art-directed DUCTAC’s 2014/15 season that commissioned theatre performances from comedian Trevor Noah, the Chicago Shakespeare Company, Indian playwright and poet Gulzar, the Moscow City Ballet, the acclaimed Hindi version of Twelfth Night, Piya Behrupiya and more.

Coates has also worked under the pseudonym A Taxi For My Uncle and as one half of the Visqueen experiments-in-noise duo. He has been a contributing writer for Harper’s Bazaar Art Arabia and Contemporary Practices magazines, among others.

Curated Exhibitions/Productions 
 2013 Peace In An Open Space, The Gallery of Light, Dubai, UAE
 2013 Praxis – An Exhibition On Drawing, The Gallery of Light, Dubai, UAE
 2013 Luma – Art In Film, The Gallery of Light, Dubai, UAE
 2014 Jeremy Deller – English Magic, The Gallery of Light, Dubai, UAE 
 2014 Giorgio Moroder's Pyramid, The Gallery of Light, Dubai, UAE
 2016 Tse Tse Fly Middle East at Quoz Arts Festival, Dubai, UAE
 2016 Tse Tse Fly Middle East at Other Worlds Festival, UK 
 2016 Tse Tse Fly Middle East on Al Noor Island, Sharjah, UAE

Selected exhibitions 
 2010 Off The Shelf Exhibition, Saltburn-By-The-Sea Gallery, York, UK
 2010 Sleeping Runners, Brick Lane Gallery, London
 2011 Artist In Residence, Gallery of Light, Dubai, UAE
 2011 Recession, Work Progress Collective, New York, USA
 2011 Artist In Residence, Sikka Art Fair, Dubai, UAE
 2012 Billboard Art Project (9 x digital artworks), Albany, NY, USA
 2012 Museum of Virulent Experience (2 x films), Conway Hall, London
 2013 Bodied Spaces (1 x film collaboration with Sara Al Haddad), Art Claims Impulse Gallery, Berlin
 2013 Noise & Whispers, GV Gallery, London
 2013 The 01 Video Art Review Tour, various venues, Poland
 2013 The Next Resistance (film collaboration with Sara Al Haddad) FIVAC Film Festival, Camaguey, Cuba
 2013 Hybrid Identities (film collaboration with Sara Al Haddad). Edinburgh, UK 
 2014 PNEM Sound art Festival (as A Taxi For My Uncle), Uden, the Netherlands
 2015 Safina Radio Project (as A Taxi For My Uncle), Dubai/Venice Biennale
 2015 Radiophrenia (as A Taxi For My Uncle), Glasgow, UK
 2016 Paratissima 2016 Art Fair, Turin, Italy
 2016 Radiophrenia, Glasgow, UK
 2016 Artist Film Festival, Bomb Factory Art Foundation, London, UK
 2016 Dronestruck sound art exhibition,  Hamline University, Minnesota, USA
 2016 Cairotronica Festival, Cairo, Egypt
 2016 Audioblast Festival, Nantes, France 
 2016 The Listening Booth project (as A Taxi For My Uncle), London, UK      
 2017 The Sound of Memory, Whitechapel Gallery, London, UK

External links 
 Official Website
 Tse Tse Fly Middle East Website

References 

Artists from Sheffield
Living people
Mixed-media artists
Year of birth missing (living people)